The Mysterious Rider is a 1948 Italian historical-adventure film directed by Riccardo Freda.

Cast 
Vittorio Gassman: Giacomo Casanova, Cavalier of Seingalt
María Mercader: Elisabetta 
Yvonne Sanson: Catherine II 
Gianna Maria Canale: Countess Lehmann
Alessandra Mamis: Countess Paola Ipatieff
Hans Hinrich: the Grand Inquisitor 
Dante Maggio: Gennaro
Guido Notari: Count Ipatieff
Vittorio Duse: Ivan 
Elli Parvo:  Dogaressa
Antonio Centa: Baron Porsky
Tino Buazzelli: Joseph

Release
The Mysterious Rider was distributed theatrically by Lux Film in Italy on 1 November 1948. It grossed a total of 180,000,000 Italian lire domestically in Italy. In 2005 the film was restored and shown as part of the retrospective "Casanova on the screen" at the 62nd Venice International Film Festival.

References

Bibliography

External links

1948 films
1940s historical adventure films
Italian historical adventure films
Films directed by Riccardo Freda
Films about Giacomo Casanova
Cultural depictions of Giacomo Casanova
Cultural depictions of Catherine the Great
Italian black-and-white films
Lux Film films
Italian swashbuckler films
Films produced by Dino De Laurentiis
Films scored by Alessandro Cicognini
1940s Italian films